Erika Andreina Mercado Chávez (born 27 February 1992), known as Erika Mercado, is a volleyball player who plays as an opposite spiker for Emirati club Sharjah Women's. Born in Ecuador, she represents Argentina internationally. She competed at the 2020 Summer Olympics.

References

1992 births
Living people
Sportspeople from Esmeraldas, Ecuador
Ecuadorian emigrants to Argentina
Naturalized citizens of Argentina
Argentine women's volleyball players
Opposite hitters
Olympic volleyball players of Argentina
Volleyball players at the 2020 Summer Olympics
Argentine expatriate sportspeople in Greece
Expatriate volleyball players in Greece
Argentine expatriate sportspeople in Germany
Expatriate volleyball players in Germany
Argentine expatriate sportspeople in the United Arab Emirates
Argentine people of Ecuadorian descent
Sportspeople of Ecuadorian descent